Hanson's Brewery may refer to:

 Hanson's Brewery, Dudley, a brewery in the Dudley, West Midlands, UK
 Hanson's Brewery, Kimberley, a brewery in the Kimberley, Derbyshire, UK